Paluchy  (Paliukhy) is a village in the administrative district of Gmina Sieniawa, within Przeworsk County, Podkarpackie Voivodeship, in south-eastern Poland.

The village has a population of 150.

References

Paluchy